The Restrictive Trade Practices Act 1956 was an act of the Parliament of the United Kingdom intended to enforce competition, and provide an appropriate check on restrictive combines and practices. It required that any agreement between companies that restricted trading should be placed on a public register unless granted exemption by the Secretary of State. Changes to an agreement, including its ending, were required to be notified and no agreement could be brought into force before appearing on the register.

The registrar could refer any agreements which appeared to operate against the public interest to the Restrictive Practices Court, a senior court of record in the United Kingdom. Though the court was overhauled in 1976, by the end of the century, the legislation was perceived as increasingly out of line with Articles 81 and 82 of the Treaty of Rome. The court was gradually replaced by a new judicial regime under the Competition Act 1998 and Enterprise Act 2002, and was ultimately disestablished on 10 March 2013.

References

Courts of England and Wales
Courts of Scotland
Courts of the United Kingdom
Competition law
Legal history of England
1956 establishments in the United Kingdom
2013 disestablishments in the United Kingdom